Yalıntaş is a villagethe Mutki District of Bitlis Province in Turkey. Its population is 755 (2021). It has an elevation of 1,700 metres above sea level.

References

Villages in Mutki District